The Yao are a predominantly Muslim people group of about 2 million spread over three countries, Malawi, northern Mozambique, and in Ruvuma Region and Mtwara Region of Tanzania people, have numerous dances to enhance celebrations throughout the calendar year. The dances are often segregated based on gender. The majority of dances fall around the initiation times for boys and girls while others are seen during religious festivals such as the syala.

Types of Yao dances

Amalilo 
The Amalilo is a large group dance involving both men and women usually seen during the end of unyago (initiation) periods.

Yao Amalilo dance in Chanika, Mandimba, Niassa, Mozambique 2011 & video from 2013

Beni 
The Beni is a popular dance involving men of all ages in which the dancers dress up like soldiers in homemade uniforms.

Yao Beni dance in Majuni, Mangochi, Malawi 2006

Chamba 
The Chamba is a secretive dance held during the second phase of msondo in which only women or girls who have gone through initiation can be present. Lessons are taught on hygiene, childrearing and more during these dances.

Chisakasa 
This dance is only for women and is related to the birth of a woman's first child. It is usually an all-night affair.

Likwata 
The Likwata is a celebratory dance in which only old women are involved.

Yao Likwata dance in Majuni, Mangochi, Malawi 2006

Lyogo 
The Lyogo is a dance seen during the time in which boys and girls are entering the unyago (initiation) camps.

Chiwoda 
The Chiwoda is an older women's dance often seen during public events.

Makwayela 
The Makwayela is a public dance performed by women of all ages.

Manganje 
The Manganje is a sexual group dance held late at night. Can involve sexual intercourse.

Manawa 
The Manawa is a girl's dance performed during nsondo (initiation).

Masewe 
The Masewe is a dance performed by younger men during the time of unyago (initiation).

Mawulidi 
The Mawulidi is a celebratory dance held by female family members of a woman who has just had a child after a long time in which no children have been born to her. The baby is passed around from woman to woman during the dance.

Msondo 
The Msondo is a dance for women only performed during times of girl's initiation. Considered by some to be quite immoral.

Sikili 
The Sikili is a religious Muslim dance in which men or women dance during syala events.

Yao Sikili dance near Chikaloni, Mandimba, Niassa, Mozambique 2013 (exception of video)

Singenge 
The Singenge is a dance performed by young girls during the time of unyago (initiation).

Yao Singenge dance in Chanika, Mandimba, Niassa, Mozambique 2013

Zimbabwe 
The Zimbabwe is one of the dances for a large group seen during the end of unyago festivities.

References 

 Dicks, Ian. An African Worldview: the Muslim Amacinga Yawo of Southern Malawi. Zomba, Malawi. Kachere Series, 2012.
 Edmondson, Laura. "National Erotica: The Politics of "Traditional" Dance in Tanzania". The MIT Press. Vol. 45, No. 1 (2001) pp 153–170
 Wegher, P. Luis. Um Olhar sobre O Niassa, 2nd vol. Maputo: Paulinas, 1999.

Malawian culture
Yao (East Africa)
Articles containing video clips